The Mona Passage is a strait that separates the islands of Hispaniola and Puerto Rico. The Mona Passage connects the Atlantic Ocean to the Caribbean Sea and is an important shipping route between the Atlantic and the Panama Canal.

The Mona Passage is 80 miles (130 kilometers) long. It is fraught with variable tidal currents created by large islands on either side of it, and by sand banks that extend out from both coasts.

Islands
There are three small islands in the Mona Passage:

Mona Island lies close to the middle of the Mona Passage.
Five kilometers northwest of Mona Island is the much smaller Monito Island.
Fifty kilometers northeast of Mona Island and much closer (21km) to the Puerto Rican mainland is Desecheo Island.

Structure and seismicity
The Passage was the site of a devastating earthquake and resulting tsunami that hit western Puerto Rico in 1918. It is the site of frequent small earthquakes. The passage is underlain by a seismically active rift zone that overprints an older partly eroded tilted-block structure. Desecheo Island sits on the Desecheo ridge, a narrow east–west ridge that extends west from the northwest corner of Puerto Rico. The ridge forms the southern boundary of the 4000 m deep Mona Canyon which extends toward the north to the strike slip fault zones which bound Puerto Rico and Hispaniola. The east face of the rift has a sharp relief of 3km and is controlled by the N - S trending Mona Rift Fault. The epicenter of the 1918 earthquake was located along the east or southeast edge of the Mona Rift.

Physical oceanography
The Mona Passage connects the Atlantic Ocean waters and Caribbean Sea waters, above a sill depth of 400 to 500 meters. The sill runs along a northwest to the southeast direction between Cabo Engaño (DR) in the west and the Cabo Rojo Shelf (PR) in the east margin of the Mona Passage. The vertical profile of the low-frequency (periods longer than 2 days) mean meridional water transport is characterized by a two-layer structure. The upper layer lies above a depth of 300 meters, with the upper water masses, the Caribbean Surface Water, Subtropical Underwater and Sargasso Sea Water entering the Caribbean Sea from the Atlantic Ocean. Below this layer, the Tropical Central Water exits toward the Atlantic Ocean. The mean value for the meridional (North-South) transport for a sampled year was -1.85 ± 0.25 sverdrup (Sv) into the Caribbean Sea.

The barotropic tide (surface tide) propagates from northeast to southwest along Mona Passage. The "principal lunar semi-diurnal" constituent, also known as the M2 (or M2) accounts for 52.35% of the total variance observed in the ocean currents and the semidiurnal current ellipses, with a clockwise rotation, are roughly aligned in a north–south direction.

Semidiurnal tidal currents impinging on a submarine ridge known as El Pichincho can force the generation of an internal tide with a wave height of 40 meters. Underwater glider observations reveal wave damping as the internal tide propagates south along the Mona Passage towards the open Caribbean Sea.

Internal tides at El Pichincho can elevate the turbulent vertical diffusivity values (or Eddy diffusion), and with a reduction of the Richardson number at the base of the pycnocline. The development of Kelvin-Helmholtz instability during the breaking of the internal tide can explain the formation of high diffusivity patches that generate a vertical flux of nitrate (NO3−) into the photic zone and can sustain new production locally.

Higher values of primary productivity were observed near the wave trough, than those observed during periods of maximum solar irradiance at noon.

Images from the Moderate-Resolution Imaging Spectroradiometer (MODIS) and International Space Station (ISS) photography show the sea-surface manifestation of packets of internal solitons (or nonlinear internal waves) generated at Banco Engaño, located at the northwest margin of the Mona Passage.

The packets propagate either into the Caribbean Sea or the Atlantic Ocean depending on the direction of the currents that forced their generation.

Surface tides, internal tides, internal solitons, inertial currents and the low frequency water mass transport between the Atlantic Ocean and the Caribbean Sea make the Mona Passage a very dynamic environment.

See also
 Battle of the Mona Passage
Bays of the Mona Passage
Mayagüez Bay
Samaná Bay
Scottish Bay
Mona Canyon
 Old Bahama Channel

References

External links
 Ecology and Geology of the Mona Passage Region
 Ocean Physics Education, Inc.
 Olas Internas en el Canal de la Mona
Bodies of water of the Dominican Republic
Bodies of water of Puerto Rico
Dominican Republic–Puerto Rico border
Geography of Hispaniola
Geography of Puerto Rico
Geography of the Dominican Republic
International straits
Straits of the Caribbean